Duingen is a village and a municipality in the district of Hildesheim, in Lower Saxony, Germany. It is situated approximately 25 km southwest of Hildesheim, and 40 km south of Hanover. Since 1 November 2016, the former municipalities Coppengrave, Hoyershausen, Marienhagen and Weenzen are part of the municipality Duingen.

Duingen was the seat of the former Samtgemeinde ("collective municipality") Duingen.

References 

Hildesheim (district)